The Simmons Sirens are the official a cappella group of Simmons College in Boston. As an all-women's institution, Simmons College prides itself on its successful all-female a cappella tradition. The Sirens participate in competitions around the Boston area.

The Simmons Sirens started in 1989 when a group of Simmons students who wanted to share music on campus through a cappella. They chose the name with the mysterious creatures of mythology in mind.  The Sirens currently  consists of 13 women aged 18 to 22 whom all  take their music passionately, while making sure they as well as their audience have a great time, every time.

The Sirens host several concerts a semester where they invite other college groups from around Boston. They also have appeared as a guest group for other a cappella groups all over the region. The Sirens have released several full-length albums, including Take '92, Enchanting You, Hypnotic, Jidda Lidda What?, and the CD How Awkward. In September 2018, The Sirens released their single "Take Me Home". In September 2020, the Sirens released their EP, Brookline Ave.

References

External links 
 Original Simmons Sirens Home Page
 Simmons Sirens A Cappella

Collegiate a cappella groups
Musical groups established in 1989
Simmons University
History of women in Massachusetts
Singers from Massachusetts